Inside Job is an American adult animated science fiction sitcom created by Shion Takeuchi for Netflix. The series premiered on October 22, 2021. Takeuchi, a former Gravity Falls writer, acts as showrunner and is an executive producer alongside Gravity Falls creator Alex Hirsch and BoJack Horseman director Mike Hollingsworth.

The series received positive reviews for its writing, humor, animation, voice acting and social commentary. The first season was released in two parts on October 22, 2021, and November 18, 2022. Netflix renewed Inside Job for a second season in June 2022; however, Takeuchi announced in January 2023 that Netflix had cancelled the series, including the second season.

Premise 
Inside Job is a workplace comedy set in a world where many conspiracy theories are real. It is centered on an American shadow government organization Cognito, Inc., which is one of six organizations that control the world (the others being the Illuminati, the Atlantians, the Reptoids, the Catholic Church and the Juggalos). The series follows a team led by a tech genius and her new partner as they work in the organization alongside reptilian shapeshifters, a human–dolphin hybrid, and a sapient mushroom from hollow Earth.

Conspiracy theories that episodes central plots revolved around were: JFK's assassination (episode 2), reptilian shapeshifters (episode 3), flat Earth (episode 6), the Moon landing (episode 8), the stoned ape theory (episode 13), and the Mandela effect (episode 17). Several other conspiracies were included in the series, but were not the main subject of episodes.

Cast

Main
 Lizzy Caplan as Reagan Ridley; a brilliant yet socially awkward and short-tempered Japanese-American robotics engineer who works at Cognito Inc. and believes that society itself can be improved, managing her irresponsible coworkers while seeking out a coveted promotion along the way. Takeuchi described Reagan as a leader who "wants to make the world a better place." It is frequently suggested by her friends, family, and co-workers that she has Asperger's, which she, in turn, denies. At the end of part 2 of season 1, she was made CEO of Cognito Inc. after her father was sent to Shadow Prison X.
 Christian Slater as Randall "Rand" Ridley; Reagan's father, and Tamiko's ex-husband. The paranoid former CEO and co-founder of Cognito Inc who was fired after nearly exposing the Deep State and trying to blow up the sun as his "solution" to cure skin cancer. He lives with his daughter Reagan, drinking copious amounts of alcohol and plotting revenge against his former employers. He is reinstated as Cognito CEO by the Shadow Board at the end of season 1 part 1 as he holds the most shares in the company. However, in the second part, he was arrested after nearly destroying the universe with a reality-altering machine called Project Reboot.
 Clark Duke as Brett Hand; a yes-man from Washington, D.C., who has a front as a frat boy but is actually a sensitive and caring person who wants his peers to follow in his footsteps and strives to bring out the best in his friends and colleagues. It is implied that he was hired partly because his generic appearance made him undetectable to facial recognition software. His dream is to be a puppet designer.
 Tisha Campbell as Gigi Thompson; a public relations officer from Atlanta, Georgia. She is the fast-talking Head of Media Manipulation and Subliminal Messages at Cognito from who is also the queen of office gossip. She is also a big flirt who goes after Brett and is constantly remarking on her looks.
 John DiMaggio as Glenn Dolphman; Cognito's jingoistic military advisor and armory chief who volunteered for a failed supersoldier experiment and was transformed into a human-dolphin hybrid.
 Bobby Lee as Dr. Andre Lee; a free-spirited yet anxious Korean-American biochemist who experiments with a range of unusual narcotics, and is also addicted to some of the very same drugs he creates.
 Brett Gelman as Myc Celium; a psychic mushroom-like organism from a hive mind deep inside Hollow Earth with a dry, sarcastic demeanor and the ability to read peoples' minds. The show's opening sequence implies that his species inadvertently brought about the evolution of humanity when their spores were consumed by ancient apes, which was confirmed to be true in the episode "Reagan & Mychelle’s Hive School Reunion". Myc also provides pure bio sorbitrate, a chemical the company uses for their memory eraser guns, which they have to literally milk him for.
 Andy Daly as J.R. Scheimpough; the former CEO of Cognito, a crafty conversationalist who can talk his way out of potentially compromising predicaments. He is sent to "Shadow Prison X" via tube at the end of season 1 part 1 after attempting to embezzle the company pension fund to purchase a volcano island lair.
 Chris Diamantopoulos as Alpha-Beta, a robot originally designed to serve as the "ROBOTUS" (robotic replacement of the President of the United States). Reagan keeps him locked up in Cognito's basement, bribing him with Friends episodes so that he will help her with various schemes. He evolves into the empathic AI upon briefly dating Reagan's mother in the second part of season 1.

Recurring

Guest role

Episodes

Production and release
In April 2019, Netflix ordered 20 episodes of the series. Billed as the first adult animated series produced in-house by Netflix Animation, it was announced in June 2021 that the regular characters in the series would be voiced by Andrew Daly, Bobby Lee, John DiMaggio, Tisha Campbell and Brett Gelman. It is the first series produced as part of a deal Takeuchi made in 2018 with Netflix to "develop new series and other projects exclusively for Netflix." A sneak peek of the series was shown at the Studio Focus Panel for Netflix at the Annecy International Animation Festival in June 2021. The series is the first series created by Shion Takeuchi, part of her deal with Netflix, with Hirsch saying he was inspired by 1990s shows like The X-Files. Hirsch and Takeuchi were also inspired by pages of Weekly World News.

In an interview with Petrana Radulovic of Polygon, Takeuchi said the idea for the show came from her days in college, said there isn't "anything too weird for the show" as long as it develops the characters, saying that there are subject matters which are a "little too adult for all-ages" that people her age deal with, saying it "feels good to be able to talk about" them in the show. She said that doing an adult animation is intimidating.

The series premiered on Netflix on October 22, 2021. Between October 24 to 31 the series was watched for 21,240,000 hours on Netflix globally. The second part of the first season was released on November 18, 2022. On June 8, 2022, Netflix renewed the series for a second season.

On January 8, 2023, Takeuchi stated that Netflix had canceled the second season. This was confirmed by a representative from Netflix.

Reception
The series received generally positive reviews from critics. Charles Bramesco of The Guardian described the series as hewing close to "the surrealism-of-the-week format" while Nick Schager of The Daily Beast described it as a workplace comedy which "jovially mocks our brain-fried reality" with numerous "sharp jabs at corporate power/gender dynamics" while highlighting absurdity of conspiracy theories and argued that the show shared some similarities with Futurama. Daniel Feinberg of The Hollywood Reporter was more critical, saying that conspiracy theories are played for laughs for "fitful results" and claimed that the show reduced Reagan's problems to issues with her father, but praised Brett for having a "believable" character arc and having a "lot of energy." Similar to Feinberg, Kevin Johnson of The A.V. Club criticized the show for limiting on how far things are taken, influenced by shows like American Dad!, The Venture Bros., Archer, and Akira, but praised the premises and jokes in the series funny, and the "talented creative team." Chris Vognar of Datebook was more positive, saying that the series is "smart and fast on its feet," and noted it remains in the real world with "office politics, sexism, classism, jingoism, nostalgia" and more, while getting viewers to care about Reagan. Burkely Hermann of The Geekiary took a different view, pointing out that "weirdness and mature subject matters" are central to the show, comparing the show to series like Mr. Robot, Futurama, Disenchantment, and described Reagan, as a character with social anxiety, as not unique, pointing to characters in Cleopatra in Space, The Owl House, She-Ra and the Princesses of Power, and Steven Universe, along with noting it doesn't "fall into the usual animated sitcom model" and pointing to "queer vibes" in the series. Aaron Pruner of Inverse noted similar themes, saying that the series is, at its core, a story about dysfunctional families at work and at home. Tracy Brown of LA Times said the series allows "audiences to laugh at conspiracy theories again" even as they provide a "backdrop to explore the characters and how they navigate the world."

The review aggregator website Rotten Tomatoes reported a 79% approval rating with an average rating of 7.20/10, based on 14 critic reviews.

References

External links
 
 

2020s American adult animated television series
2020s American comic science fiction television series
2020s American workplace comedy television series
2020s American black comedy television series
2021 American television series debuts
2022 American television series endings
2020s Canadian adult animated television series
2020s Canadian comic science fiction television series
2020s Canadian workplace comedy television series
2021 Canadian television series debuts
2022 Canadian television series endings
American adult animated comedy television series
American adult animated science fiction television series
American flash adult animated television series
American spy comedy television series
Canadian adult animated comedy television series
Canadian adult animated science fiction television series
Canadian flash animated television series
English-language Netflix original programming
Television series by Jam Filled Entertainment
Television series by Netflix Animation
Asian-American television
Television series about conspiracy theories
Television shows set in Washington, D.C.
Conspiracy theories in popular culture